Dawn Anna is a 2005 American dramatic television film written by Robert Munic, Arliss Howard, and James Howard, and directed by Arliss Howard. The film, based upon real events surrounding the Columbine High School massacre, premiered on Lifetime Television January 10, 2005.

Production
This film was produced by Tom Cox, Peter Lhotka, Murray Ord and Jordy Randall, and co-produced by Arliss Howard. Executive producers of this film were Tom Patricia, Madeleine Sherak, William Sherak and Jason Shuman.

Plot summary 
The movie depicts the life of Dawn Anna, a teacher and single mother of four children. Soon after meeting her eventual husband, she is diagnosed with a severe brain disease that requires a serious operation. Shortly after her recovery, daughter Lauren Townsend is murdered by shooters in the massacre at Columbine.

Cast

Awards 
Debra Winger was nominated for 'Outstanding Lead Actress in a Miniseries or a Movie' at the 2005 Primetime Emmy Awards.

References

External links 
 
 
 Official Lifetime Page for the movie

2005 television films
2005 films
2005 crime drama films
American crime drama films
Drama films based on actual events
Films set in 1999
Films set in Colorado
Lifetime (TV network) films
Crime films based on actual events
Works about the Columbine High School massacre
American drama television films
2000s English-language films
2000s American films